The Second Northern War (1655–60), (also First or Little Northern War) was fought between Sweden and its adversaries the Polish–Lithuanian Commonwealth (1655–60), the Tsardom of Russia (1656–58), Brandenburg-Prussia (1657–60), the Habsburg monarchy (1657–60) and Denmark–Norway (1657–58 and 1658–60). The Dutch Republic waged an informal trade war against Sweden and seized the colony of New Sweden in 1655, but was not a recognized part of the Polish–Danish alliance.

In 1655, Charles X Gustav of Sweden invaded and occupied western Poland–Lithuania, the eastern half of which was already occupied by Russia. The rapid Swedish advance became known in Poland as the Swedish Deluge. The Grand Duchy of Lithuania became a Swedish protectorate, the Polish–Lithuanian regular armies surrendered and the Polish king John II Casimir Vasa fled to the Habsburgs. Frederick William, Elector of Brandenburg and Duke of Prussia initially supported the estates in Royal Prussia, but allied with Sweden in return for receiving the Duchy of Prussia as a Swedish fief. Exploiting the hurt religious feelings of the Roman Catholic population under Protestant occupation and organizing Polish–Lithuanian military leaders in the Tyszowce Confederation, John II Casimir Vasa managed to regain ground in 1656. Russia took advantage of the Swedish setback, declared war on Sweden and pushed into Lithuania and Swedish Livonia.

Charles X Gustav then granted Frederick William full sovereignty in the Duchy of Prussia in return for military aid, and in the Treaty of Radnot allied himself with the Transylvanian George II Rákóczi who invaded Poland–Lithuania from the southeast. John II Vasa found an ally in Leopold I of Habsburg, whose armies crossed into Poland–Lithuania from the southwest. This triggered Frederick III of Denmark's invasion of the Swedish mainland in early 1657, in an attempt to settle old scores from the Torstenson War while Sweden was busy elsewhere. Brandenburg left the alliance with Sweden when granted full sovereignty in the Duchy of Prussia by the Polish king in the treaties of Wehlau and Bromberg.

Frederick III's war on Sweden gave Charles X Gustav a reason to abandon the Polish–Lithuanian deadlock and fight Denmark instead. After marching his army to the west and making a dangerous crossing of the frozen straits in the winter of 1657/58, he surprised the unprepared Frederick III on the Danish isles and forced him into surrender. In the Treaty of Roskilde, Denmark had to abandon all Danish provinces in what is now Southern Sweden. The anti-Swedish allies meanwhile neutralized the Transylvanian army and Polish forces ravaged Swedish Pomerania.

In 1658 Charles X Gustav decided that instead of returning to the remaining Swedish strongholds in Poland–Lithuania, he would rather attack Denmark again. This time, Denmark withstood the attack and the anti-Swedish allies pursued Charles X Gustav to Jutland and Swedish Pomerania. Throughout 1659, Sweden was defending her strongholds in Denmark and on the southern Baltic shore, while little was gained by the allies and a peace was negotiated. When Charles X Gustav died in February 1660, his successor settled for the Treaty of Oliva with Poland–Lithuania, the Habsburgs and Brandenburg in April and the Treaty of Copenhagen with Denmark in May. Sweden was to keep most of her gains from Roskilde, the Duchy of Prussia became a sovereign state, and otherwise, the parties largely returned to the status quo ante bellum. Sweden had already concluded a truce with Russia in 1658, which gave way to a final settlement in the Treaty of Cardis in 1661.

Terminology

In English language, German, Russian and Scandinavian historiography, these conflicts were traditionally referred to as First Northern War. The term "Second Northern War", coined in Polish historiography (Druga Wojna Północna), has lately been increasingly adopted by German and English language historiography. Another ambiguous term referring to the Second Northern War is the Little Northern War, which however might also refer to the 1741–43 war. In Poland, the term "The Deluge" is also ambiguous, as it is sometimes used for a broader series of wars against Sweden, Brandenburg, Russia, Transylvania and the Cossacks.

Prelude

In 1648, the Peace of Westphalia had ended the Thirty Years' War, during which the Swedish Empire emerged as a major European power. In the Torstenson War, a theater of the Thirty Years' War, Sweden had defeated the former Baltic great power Denmark-Norway. Sweden had been at peace with Russia since the Treaty of Stolbovo had ended the Ingrian War in 1617. Sweden had remained in a state of war with the Polish–Lithuanian Commonwealth since the Polish–Swedish War (1626–29), which was concluded by the repeatedly renewed truce (Altmark, Stuhmsdorf).
In 1651, an unsuccessful congress was organised in Lübeck to mediate peace talks between Sweden and Poland-Lithuania. 

On the other hand, the Commonwealth, under king John II Casimir Vasa since 1648, experienced a crisis resulting both from the Cossack Khmelnytsky Uprising in the southeast and from the paralysis of the administration due to the internal quarrels of the nobility, including feuds between the king and the Lithuanian hetman Janusz Radziwiłł and feuds among disagreeing sejmiks who had been able to stall each other's ambitions with the liberum veto since 1652. As a consequence, the Commonwealth lacked a sufficient defense.

In January 1654, the anti-Polish alliance of Pereiaslav was concluded between the rebellious Cossack Hetman Bohdan Khmelnytsky and Alexis of Russia, who was in control of a well-equipped army that was undergoing modernization. In 1654, when Charles X Gustav succeeded his cousin Christina on the Swedish throne, Russian forces were advancing into the unprotected Commonwealth, and by focusing on the northeast these drew close to the Swedish sphere of interest at the Baltic coast. Seeing the great success on the Russian side, Sweden also decided to intervene, among other reasons using the explanation that it was to protect the Protestant population in Poland. Having a close relationship with the Prince of Transylvania, Sweden had intentions to defeat Catholic Poland. Sweden also drew the rising Cossack Hetmanate to its side that stood in strong opposition to the Polish government and promised military support if the Cossacks would break with the Russians. Bohdan Khmelnytsky sent an expedition headed by the Kiev colonel to Halychyna which soon turned back due to mutiny within its ranks. The leader of Hetmanate did not participate in the actions due to poor health conditions.

Sweden, at that time an expansionist empire with an army designed to be maintained by the revenues of occupied territory, was conscious that a direct attack on her main adversary Russia could well result in a Dano-Polish–Russian alliance. Also, Sweden was prevented from forming a Swedish–Polish alliance by the refusal of John II Casimir to drop his claims to the Swedish crown and the unwillingness of the Polish–Lithuanian nobility to make the territorial and political concessions an alliance with Sweden would eventually cost, final negotiations in Lübeck during February 1655 ended without a result. Thus, Sweden opted for a preemptive attack on the Polish–Lithuanian Commonwealth to occupy its yet available territories before the Russians.

Swedish campaigns in the Polish–Lithuanian Commonwealth

Swedish forces entered Poland–Lithuania from Swedish Pomerania in the west, and Livonia in the north. The division on the western flank consisted of 13,650 men and 72 artillery pieces commanded by Arvid Wittenberg who entered Poland on 21 July 1655 and another 12,700 to 15,000 commanded by Charles X Gustav who followed in August, while the division on the northern flank consisted of 7,200 men commanded by Magnus De la Gardie who had already seized Dünaburg with them on 12 July.

On the western front, Wittenberg was opposed by a Polish levy of 13,000 and an additional 1,400 peasant infantry. Aware of the military superiority of the well-trained Swedish army, the nobles of Greater Poland surrendered to Wittenberg on 25 July in Ujście after the Battle of Ujście, and then pledged loyalty to the Swedish king. Wittenberg established a garrison in Poznań (Posen). 
On the northern front, Prince Janusz Radziwiłł signed the Treaty of Kėdainiai with Sweden on 17 August 1655, placing the Grand Duchy of Lithuania under Swedish protection. Though Radziwiłł had been negotiating with Sweden before, during his dispute with the Polish king, Kėdainiai provided a clause stipulating that the two parts of the Commonwealth, Poland and Lithuania, need not fight each other. Part of the Lithuanian army opposed the treaty however, forming a confederation led by the magnate and Polish–Lithuanian hetman Paweł Jan Sapieha at Wierzbołów.

On 24 August, Charles X Gustav joined Wittenberg's forces. The Polish king John II Casimir left Warsaw the same month to confront the Swedish army in the west, but after some skirmishes with the Swedish vanguard retreated southwards to Kraków. On 8 September Charles X Gustav occupied Warsaw, then turned south to confront the retreating Polish king. The kings met at the Battle of Żarnów on 16 September, which like the next encounter at the Battle of Wojnicz on 3 October was a victory for Sweden. John II Casimir was exiled to Silesia while Kraków surrendered to Charles X Gustav on 19 October.

On 20 October, a second treaty was ratified at Kėdainiai in the north. The Union of Kėdainiai unified Lithuania with Sweden, with Radziwiłł recognizing Charles X Gustav as Grand Duke of Lithuania. Over the following days, most of the Polish army surrendered to Sweden: on 26 October Koniecpolski surrendered with 5,385 men near Kraków, on 28 October Field Crown Hetman Stanisław Lanckoroński and Great Crown Hetman Stanisław "Rewera" Potocki surrendered with 10,000 men, and on 31 October the levy of Mazovia surrendered after the Battle of Nowy Dwór.

Occupation of Poland–Lithuania and the Brandenburgian intervention

Meanwhile, Russian and Cossack forces had occupied the east of the Polish–Lithuanian Commonwealth as far as Lublin, with only Lwow (Lviv, Lemberg) remaining under Polish–Lithuanian control. In late October, Charles X Gustav headed northwards and left Wittenberg in Kraków with a mobile force of 3,000 Swedish and 2,000 Polish troops, and an additional number scattered in garrisons, to control the southern part of the Swedish-occupied commonwealth.

In the north, the Royal Prussian nobles concluded a defensive alliance with the Electorate of Brandenburg on 12 November in the Treaty of Rinsk, permitting Brandenburgian garrisons. Danzig (Gdansk), Thorn (Torun) and Elbing (Elblag) had not participated in the treaty, with Thorn and Elbing surrendering to Sweden. In the Treaty of Königsberg on 17 January 1656, Frederick William, Elector of Brandenburg and Duke of Prussia, took the Duchy of Prussia, formerly a Polish fief, as a fief from Charles X Gustav. The Brandenburgian garrisons in Royal Prussia were withdrawn, and when Marienburg (Malbork) surrendered in March, Danzig remained the only town not under Swedish control.

The rapid Swedish invasion and occupation of the Polish–Lithuanian territories became known in Poland as the "(Swedish) deluge."

Polish–Lithuanian recovery

The "deluge" and religious differences between the primarily Protestant Swedes and the primarily Catholic Poles, resulting in cases of maltreatment and murder of Catholic clergy and monks as well as cases of looting of Catholic churches and monasteries, gave rise to some partisan movements in the Swedish-occupied territory. A guerilla force attacked a small Swedish garrison at Koscian in October 1655 and killed Frederick of Hesse, brother-in-law of the Swedish king. The Pauline monastery Jasna Góra in Częstochowa successfully resisted a Swedish siege throughout November 1655 to January 1656. On 20 November a manifesto was issued in Opole (Oppeln) calling for public resistance and the return of John II Casimir, and in December a peasant force took Nowy Sącz. On 29 December, the partisan Tyszowce Confederation was constituted under participation of Lanckoroński and Potocki, and on 1 January 1656 John II Casimir returned from exile. Later in January, Stefan Czarniecki joined in, and by February most Polish soldiers who were in Swedish service since October 1655, had switched sides to that of the confederation.

Charles X Gustav, with a force of 11,000 horse, reacted by pursuing Czarniecki's force of 2,400 men, confronting and defeating him in the Battle of Gołąb in February 1656. Charles X Gustav then intended to take Lwow, but his advance was halted in the Battle of Zamość, when he was nearly encircled by the growing Polish–Lithuanian armies under Sapieha and Czarniecki, and barely escaped on 5 and 6 April breaking through Sapieha's lines during the Battle of Sandomierz at the cost of his artillery and baggage. A Swedish relief force under Frederick of Baden was destroyed by Czarniecki on 7 April in the Battle of Warka. In the same month, John II Casimir with the Lwów Oath proclaimed Virgin Mary queen of Poland, and promised to lift the burdens inflicted on the peasantry if he regained control.

Brandenburgian-Swedish alliance and Russia's war on Sweden

On 25 June 1656, Charles X Gustav signed an alliance with Brandenburg: the Treaty of Marienburg granted Greater Poland to Frederick William in return for military aid. While the Brandenburgian elector was free of Swedish vassalage in Greater Poland, he remained a Swedish vassal for the Duchy of Prussia. Brandenburgian garrisons then replaced the Swedish ones in Greater Poland, who went to reinforce Charles X Gustav's army. On 29 June however, Warsaw was stormed by John II Casimir, who had drawn up to Charles X Gustav with a force of 28,500 regulars and a noble levy of 18,000 to 20,000. Thereupon, Brandenburg actively participated in the war on the Swedish side, prompting John II Casimir Vasa to state that while his Tartars already had the Swedes for breakfast, he would now take Frederick William into custody, where neither sun nor moon would shine.

Already in May 1656, Alexis of Russia had declared war on Sweden, taking advantage of Charles being tied up in Poland, and Livonia, Estonia and Ingria secured only by a Livonian army of 2,200 infantry and 400 dragoons, Magnus de la Gardie's 7,000 men in Prussia, and 6,933 men dispersed in garrisons along the Eastern Baltic coast. Alexis invaded Livonia in July with 35,000 men and took Dünaburg.

In late July, Danzig was reinforced by a Dutch garrison, and a combined Danish and Dutch fleet broke the naval blockage imposed on Danzig by Charles X Gustav. On 28–30 July, a combined Brandenburgian-Swedish army was able to defeat the Polish–Lithuanian army in the Battle of Warsaw, forcing John II Casimir to retreat to Lublin. In August, Alexis' army took Livonian Kokenhausen (Koknese), laid siege to Riga and Dorpat (Tartu) and raided Estonia, Ingria and Kexholm.

On 4 October, John II Casimir stormed Łęczyca in Greater Poland before heading for Royal Prussia, and on 8 October, Wincenty Korwin Gosiewski with 12,000 to 13,000 Lithuanian and Crimean Tartar cavalry overran a Brandenburgian-Swedish force in the Battle of Prostken in Ducal Prussia. Gosiewski then ravaged Ducal Prussia, burning 13 towns and 250 villages, in a campaign that entered folklore because of the high death toll and the high number of captives deported to the Crimea.

On 22 October, Gosiewski was defeated by Swedish forces in the Battle of Filipów and turned to Lithuania. Also on 22 October, besieged Dorpat surrendered to Alexis, while the Russian siege of Swedish-held Riga was lifted. John II Casimir meanwhile took Bromberg (Bydgoszcz) and Konitz in Royal Prussia, and from 15 November 1656 until February 1657 stayed in Danzig, where a Swedish siege had to be lifted due to Dutch intervention, just 55 kilometers away from Charles X Gustav's quarters in Elbing.

Swedish–Brandenburgian–Transylvanian–Romanian alliance and the truces with Russia

In the Treaty of Labiau on 20 November, Charles X Gustav of Sweden granted Frederick William of Brandenburg full sovereignty in the Duchy of Prussia in return for a more active participation in the war. In the Treaty of Radnot on 6 December, Charles X Gustav promised to accept George II Rákóczi of Transylvania as king of Poland and Grand Duke of Lithuania in return for his entrance into the war. Rákóczi entered the war in January 1657, crossing into the commonwealth with a force of 25,000 Transylvanian-Wallachian-Moldavian men and 20,000 Cossacks who reinforced Kraków before they met with Charles X Gustav, who had led a Swedish-Brandenburgian army southwards. The following month saw the Swedish-Brandenburg-Transylvanian-Romanian-Cossack forces play cat and mouse with the Polish–Lithuanian forces, moving about all of the commonwealth without any major engagements, except the capture of Brest by Charles X Gustav in May, and the sack of Warsaw by Rákóczi and Gustaf Otto Stenbock on 17 June.

Due to internal conflicts within the Cossacks there was practically no participation of the Cossack Hetmanate in that war. Worn out from previous campaigns and requesting Bohdan Khmelnytsky to break with Sweden, Alexis of Russia eventually signed the Truce of Vilna or Niemież with the Polish–Lithuanian Commonwealth, and did not engage the Swedish army in any major battle throughout 1657 even though he still reinforced his armies in Livonia. On 18 June, a Swedish force defeated a Russian army of 8,000 men commanded by Matvey V. Sheremetev in the Battle of Walk. In early 1658, Sweden and Russia agreed on a truce, resulting in the Treaty of Valiesar (Vallisaare, 1658) and the Treaty of Kardis (Kärde, 1661). The Russian war with Poland–Lithuania on the other hand resumed in 1658.

Austro–Brandenburgian–Polish alliance, Danish campaigns in Sweden

Like Sweden, John II Casimir was also looking for allies to break the deadlock of the war. On 1 December 1656, he signed an alliance with Ferdinand III of Habsburg in Vienna, essentially a declaration of Ferdinand III's intend to mediate a peace rather than provide military aid, which did not come into effect until Ferdinand's death on 2 April 1657. The treaty was however renewed and amended on 27 May by Ferdinand's successor Leopold I of Habsburg, who agreed in Vienna to provide John II Casimir with 12,000 troops maintained at Polish expense; in return, Leopold received Kraków and Posen in pawn. Receiving the news, Frederick III of Denmark promptly declared war on Sweden, and by June the Austrian army entered the Polish–Lithuanian Commonwealth from the south, immediately stabilizing the situation in southern Poland by conquering Kraków, while Denmark attacked Swedish Bremen-Verden and turned to Jämtland and Västergötland in July.

When Charles X Gustav left the Commonwealth and headed westwards for an anti-Danish counterstrike, the Swedish–Brandenburgian–Transylvanian alliance broke apart. Rákóczi of Transylvania was unable to withstand the combined Austrian and Polish–Lithuanian forces without Swedish support, and after a pursuit into Ukraine he was encircled and forced to capitulate, with the rest of the Transylvanian army defeated by the Tartars.

Brandenburg changed sides in return for Polish withdrawal of claims to Ducal Prussia, declaring Frederick William the sole sovereign in the Duchy with the treaties of Wehlau on 19 September and Bromberg on 6 November. In addition, the aforementioned treaties secured Brandenburg the Lands of Lauenburg and Bütow at the border of Brandenburgian Pomerania, while the Bishopric of Ermeland was returned to Poland.

Denmark–Norway and Pomerania

The attack of Frederick III of Denmark in June 1657, aimed at regaining the territories lost in 1645, provided an opportunity for Charles X Gustav to abandon the unfortunate Polish–Lithuanian battlefields. With 9,950 horse and 2,800 foot, he marched through Pomerania and Mecklenburg. In Holstein, the Swedish force was split with Carl Gustaf Wrangel heading west to clear Bremen-Verden and Charles X Gustav heading north to clear Jutland. When these aims were achieved, Charles X Gustav in September moved to the Swedish port of Wismar and ordered his navy into the inconclusive Battle of Møn.

Meanwhile, Polish forces led by general Stefan Czarniecki ravaged southern Swedish Pomerania, and destroyed and plundered Pasewalk, Gartz (Oder) and Penkun. The Habsburg and Brandenburg allies however were reluctant to join Czarniecki, and against John II Casimir's wish decided against taking the war to the Holy Roman Empire fearing the start of a new Thirty Years' War.

The harsh winter of 1657/58 had forced the Dano-Norwegian fleet to stay in port, and the Great and Little Belts separating the Danish isles from the mainland were frozen. After entering Jutland from the south, a Swedish army of 7,000 veterans undertook the March across the Belts; on 9 February 1658, the Little Belt was crossed and the island Funen (Fyn) captured within a few days, and soon thereafter Langeland, Lolland and Falster. On 25 February, the Swedish army continued across the Great Belt to Zealand where the Danish capital Copenhagen is located. Although only 5,000 men made it across the belts, the Swedish attack was completely unexpected; Frederick III was compelled to surrender and signed the disadvantageous Treaty of Roskilde on 26 February 1658.

Sweden had won its most prestigious victory, and Denmark had suffered its most costly defeat. Denmark was forced to yield the provinces of Scania, Halland, Blekinge and the island of Bornholm. Halland had already been under Swedish control since the signing of the Treaty of Brömsebro in 1645, but they now became Swedish territory indefinitely. Denmark also had to surrender the Norwegian province Trøndelag to Sweden.

Yet, Swedish-held territory in Poland had been reduced to some towns in Royal Prussia, most notably Elbing, Marienburg and Thorn. With Transylvania neutralized and Brandenburg defected, Charles X Gustav's position in the region was not strong enough to force his stated aim, the permanent gain of Royal Prussia. He was further pressed militarily when an Austro-Polish army laid siege to Thorn in July 1658, and diplomatically when he was urged by France to settle. France was unwilling to intervene militarily, and Sweden could not afford to violate the Peace of Westphalia by attacking the Habsburg and Brandenburgian possessions in the Holy Roman Empire, which would likely have driven several Germans into the anti-Swedish alliance. Thus, Charles X Gustav opted to instead attack Denmark again.

When the Danes stalled and prolonged the fulfillment of some provisions of the Treaty of Roskilde by postponing payments and not blocking foreign fleets from access to the Baltic Sea, and with half of the 2,000 Danish soldiers that were obliged by Roskilde to enter Swedish service deserting, the Swedish king embarked from Kiel with a force of 10,000 men on 16 August. While everyone expected him to head for Royal Prussia, he disembarked on Zealand on 17 August, and headed for Copenhagen, which was defended by 10,650 Danes and 2,000 Dutch. This time however, the town did not surrender, and a long siege ensued. When Swedish forces took Kronborg in September, they controlled both sides of the Øresund, yet in November a Dutch fleet broke the Swedish naval blockade of Copenhagen in the Battle of the Sound.

Meanwhile, the anti-Swedish alliance had deployed an army to Denmark, to confront Charles X Gustav with a force of 14,500 Brandenburgers commanded by Frederick William, 10,600 Austrians commanded by Raimondo Montecuccoli, and 4,500 Poles commanded by Czarniecki. By January 1659, the allied forces stood at Fredriksodde, Kolding and Als. Charles X Gustav then tried a decisive assault on Copenhagen on 21 and 22 February, but was repelled.

Sweden entrenched

In 1659, the war was characterized by Swedish forces defending their strongholds on the southern Baltic coast against allied assaults. A combined force of 17,000 Austrians and 13,000 Brandenburgers led by general Jean-Louis Raduit de Souches invaded Swedish Pomerania, took and burned Greifenhagen, took Wollin island and Damm, besieged Stettin and Greifswald without success, but took Demmin on 9 November. Counterattacks were mounted by general Müller von der Lühnen, who lifted the siege laid on Greifswald by the Brandenburgian prince-elector, and major general Paul Wirtz, who from besieged Stettin managed to capture the Brandenburgian ammunition depot at Curau and took it to Stralsund. The Brandenburgians withdrew ravaging the countryside while retreating.

In the occupied and annexed Danish provinces, guerilla movements pressed Swedish garrisons. After an uprising, Norwegians took Trondheim in late 1658. In Scania and Zealand, the "snaphaner" led by Lorenz Tuxen and Svend Poulsen ("Gøngehøvdingen") ambushed Swedish forces. The Swedish garrison of Bornholm was forced to surrender to Danish insurgents, with the commander killed.

In Royal Prussia (Eastern Pomerania in contemporary Poland), Thorn had fallen already in December 1658, but Elbing and Marienwerder withstood. On 24 November, Sweden had to abandon Funen and Langeland after the defeat in the Battle of Nyborg. In January 1660, Sweden lost the Livonian fortress Mitau.

Meanwhile, conflicts arose within the anti-Swedish alliance between the Habsburgs and Poland–Lithuania when the Habsburgs demanded ever more contributions while not showing the war efforts Poland–Lithuania had expected. With the Russo-Polish War ongoing, most Polish–Lithuanian forces were tied up in Ukraine. England, France and the Dutch Republic had agreed on a petition in the First Concert of the Hague, urging Sweden to settle for peace with Denmark on the terms of Roskilde, and peace talks mediated by France were taking place throughout 1659.

North American theatre 

The colony of New Sweden lay along the Delaware River, a territory claimed but not settled by Dutch New Netherland. The Swedish colonists were the preferred trading partners of the Susquehannock, who at that time were the most powerful indigenous group in the Delaware Valley and rivals to the Iroquois Confederacy further north. The Iroquois in turn were allies of the Dutch.

The Dutch–Polish alliance in Europe left its mark in New Netherland. Among the small Polish community in New Amsterdam was Daniel Liczko, a military officer who took part in an expedition to erect a fort in Swedish territory in 1651. Director-General Peter Stuyvesant named the outpost Fort Casimir after the Polish king, but it was captured and renamed Fort Trinity (Swedish: Trefaldigheten) by Swedish governor Johan Risingh in May 1654. Following the outbreak of the Second Northern War in Europe, Stuyvesant retaliated. In the summer of 1655, he dispatched most of the colonial garrison to the Delaware River and led a squadron of ships to attack New Sweden. The Dutch recaptured Fort Trinity on 11 September and besieged the Swedish capital at Fort Christina for ten days before Risingh surrendered on 15 September. This effectively marked the end of New Sweden, but for a time the Swedish and Finnish settlers continued to enjoy local autonomy with their own militia, religion, court and lands. Sweden had no further territorial presence in the Americas until the acquisition of Saint Barthélemy from France in 1784.

On 15 September, while the bulk of the Dutch garrison was still in New Sweden, the Susquehannock amassed some 600 warriors and launched a punitive attack on New Amsterdam and the surrounding farms, which tended to be isolated and remote. They took hundreds of hostages and forced the Dutch to retreat to Fort Amsterdam. After renegotiating land rights and securing the release of the hostages, the Dutch resettled most of their abandoned territory and constructed several additional fortifications. Stuyvesant decreed that "like our neighbors of New England," the New Netherland colonists must now "concentrate themselves... in the form of towns, villages and hamlets, so that they may be the more effectually protected" against future attacks. Notably, the Staten Island colony was not reoccupied. Its patroon was Cornelis Melyn, former chairman of the Council of Eight Men and a political rival of Stuyvesant; he had been imprisoned without trial earlier in the year. Melyn and his family defected to English New Haven soon after his release.

Peace

Charles X Gustav fell ill in early 1660 and died on 23 February of that year. With his death, one of the major obstacles to peace was gone and the Treaty of Oliva was signed on 23 April. Sweden was accepted as sovereign in Swedish Livonia, Brandenburg was accepted as sovereign in Ducal Prussia, and John II Casimir withdrew his claims to the Swedish throne, though he was to retain the title for life. All occupied territories were restored to their pre-war sovereigns.

However, Denmark was not keen on peace after its recent successes and witnessing the weakness of the Swedish efforts. The Dutch Republic withdrew its blockade but was soon convinced by Denmark to support them again. France and England intervened for Sweden and the situation again teetered on the edge of a major conflict. However, the Danish statesman Hannibal Sehested negotiated a peace treaty without any direct involvement by foreign powers. The conflict was resolved with the Treaty of Copenhagen (1660). Sweden returned Bornholm and Trøndelag to Denmark. The treaty of 1660 established political borders between Denmark, Sweden and Norway which have lasted to the present day, and secured the Swedish dominium maris baltici.

Russia, still engaged in the Russo-Polish War (1654–1667), settled its dispute with Sweden in the Treaty of Cardis, which restored Russian-occupied Swedish territory to Sweden.

List of peace treaties 
Treaty of Königsberg: Sweden and Brandenburg–Prussia (1656, superseded by Bromberg and Oliva)
Treaty of Bromberg: Brandenburg–Prussia and Poland–Lithuania
Treaty of Roskilde: Sweden and Denmark-Norway (1658, superseded by Copenhagen)
Treaty of Oliva: Sweden and Brandenburg–Prussia, Austria and Poland–Lithuania (1660)
Treaty of Copenhagen: Sweden and Denmark–Norway (1660)
Treaty of Cardis: Sweden and Russia (1661)

See also
Great Northern War
List of Prussian wars
 List of Swedish wars
 Polish–Swedish wars
 Second Northern War and Norway
 Deluge (history)

Notes

Sources

References

Bibliography

External links

 
Northern Wars
17th-century conflicts
Wars involving Denmark
Wars involving Moldavia
Wars involving Sweden
Wars involving Transylvania
Northern Wars (1655-1661)
Wars involving Wallachia
Wars involving the Polish–Lithuanian Commonwealth
1650s in the Polish–Lithuanian Commonwealth
Poland–Sweden relations
Warfare of the Early Modern period
17th century in Sweden
Wars involving the Holy Roman Empire